The flag of Tristan da Cunha was adopted on October 20, 2002, in a proclamation made by the Governor of Saint Helena under a Royal Warrant granted by Queen Elizabeth II.

The flag is a blue ensign design, defaced with the coat of arms of Tristan da Cunha — a Tristan longboat above a Naval Crown, with a central shield decorated with four yellow-nosed albatross and flanked by two Tristan rock lobsters. Below this, there is a scroll with the territory's motto, Our faith is our strength.

References 

Flags displaying animals
Flag
Tristan da Cunha
Tristan da Cunha
Tristan